Stone v. Chisolm, 113 U.S. 302 (1885), was a writ of error to reverse a judgment of the Circuit Court for the District of South Carolina, which dismissed the complaint in which the plaintiff asked for recovery in the sum of $1,050 with interest from July 1, 1883 Sixty bonds or obligations of the Marine and River Phosphate Mining and Manufacturing Company of South Carolina which became totally insolvent.

The court found that in order to ascertain the existence of the liability in a given case requires an account to be taken of the amount of the corporate indebtedness, and of the amount of the capital stock actually paid in, facts which the directors, upon whom the liability is imposed, have a right to have determined, once for all, in a proceeding which shall conclude all who have an adverse interest, and a right to participate in the benefit to result from enforcing the liability. Otherwise the facts which constitute the basis of liability might be determined differently by juries in several actions, by which some creditors might obtain satisfaction and others be defeated. The evident intention of the provision is that the liability shall be for the common benefit of all entitled to enforce it according to their interest, an apportionment which, in case there cannot be satisfaction for all, can only be made in a single proceeding to which all interested can be made parties.

The case could not be distinguished from that of Honner v. Henning, 93 U. S. 228, the reasoning and result in which was reaffirmed.

It is immaterial that in this case it does not appear that there are other creditors than the plaintiffs in error. There can be but one rule for construing the section, whether the creditors be one or many. To the question certified, therefore, it must be answered that an action at law will not lie, and that the only remedy is by a suit in equity. The judgment was accordingly affirmed.

See also
List of United States Supreme Court cases, volume 113

References

External links
 

United States Supreme Court cases
United States Supreme Court cases of the Waite Court
1885 in United States case law